Frédéric Jousset (born 3 May 1970) is a French entrepreneur and philanthropist.  He is the founder and co-chairman of Webhelp, a business outsourcing company headquartered in France. He is also the administrator of the Musée du Louvre as of December 2016.

Life 
Son of Marie-Laure Jousset, Chief Curator at Beaubourg, and Hubert Jousset, President of the GEFIP and the École normale de musique, Frédéric Jousset graduated from HEC in 1992. 

Jousset began his career in 1994 for Kérastase at L'Oréal. Four years later, he founded his first company, Clientis SA, a software publisher for beauty salons. He joined the American strategy consulting firm Bain & Company where he worked as a strategy consultant.

In June 2000, he co-founded with Olivier Duha Webhelp SA, which originally offered IT support services and later expanded into operating call centres and outsourcing business services. The group employs 55,000 people and had a turnover of 1.45 billion euros in 2019. 

In 2012, Frédéric Jousset was awarded the Mercury of Honour for Business Creation at HEC and, along with Olivier Duha, was elected Manager of the Year in 2013 by the Nouvel Economiste/Financial Times.

Art, culture and patronage 

Frédéric Jousset was Chairman of the Board of Directors of the École nationale supérieure des beaux-arts in Paris between 2011 and 2014 and was a member of the Acquisitions Commission of the Musée du Louvre from 2007 to 2014. Webhelp contributed to the acquisition of La Fuite en Egypte, by Nicolas Poussin. As a result of these different forms of support, he was a member of the Louvre's patronage council and was awarded the distinction of grand patron of the museum. In May 2016, he bought Beaux Arts Magazine for 5 million euros to invest in its development including digital technology, training and events.

In December 2016, Frédéric Jousset was appointed administrator of the Musée du Louvre by decree of the Minister of Culture.

In 2018, the Minister of Culture Françoise Nyssen entrusted him with the steering of the working group linked to the culture pass for young people.

Frédéric Jousset obtained a 50-year concession for the Relais de Chambord hotel located opposite the Château de Chambord. He called upon the architect Jean Michel Wilmotte for the complete renovation. The hotel reopened in March 2018 with 55 rooms, suites and a gourmet restaurant.

He has been administrator of the Ecole Nationale Supérieure des Arts Décoratifs since July 2019.

In December 2019, Frédéric Jousset created the ART EXPLORA  fund with a capital of 6 million euros to finance actions aimed at reducing the cultural divide in Europe and supporting artistic creation. He launched the annual ART EXPLORA prize endowed with 150,000 euros in collaboration with the Académie des Beaux arts to reward the most innovative European museums in their search for new audiences.

Associations 

Frédéric Jousset is Chairman of the association of the 55,000 alumni from the HEC group, and as such is a director of the HEC group.

He is also a member of Croissance Plus, of which Olivier Duha was Chairman from 2011 to 2013, the Founders Forum and the association le Siècle.

Honours 

 Commander of the Ordre des Arts et des Lettres (July 2014 - France)
 Knight of the National Order of Merit (France) (June 2010 - France)
 Knight of the Ordre des Arts et des Lettres (July 14, 2008 - France)
Commander of the Ordre des Arts et des Lettres (July 14, 2014 - France)
 Commander of the Order of Order of Ouissam Alaouite of the kingdom of Morocco (2008 - France)
 Medal of Grand Donor by Ministry of Culture and communication (2007 - France)
Knight of the Legion of Honour (January 1, 2019)

References 

1970 births
Living people
HEC Paris alumni
French chief executives